Marina Nigg (born in Vaduz on 24 April 1984) is a Liechtensteiner alpine skier who represented Liechtenstein at the 2010 Winter Olympics. Nigg specializes in the slalom and giant slalom events, and finished 22nd in the slalom at the 2010 Winter Olympics.

References

External links
 
 FIS-Ski.com – Biography/Results

Olympic alpine skiers of Liechtenstein
Alpine skiers at the 2010 Winter Olympics
Liechtenstein female alpine skiers
People from Vaduz
1984 births
Living people
Alpine skiers at the 2014 Winter Olympics